Teddy Killerz are a Russian and Ukrainian electronic music group composed of Grigory Cherekaev, Anton Mashevsky and Oleg Cholovskyi. They also perform under their individual stage names as Garud, Place 2b, and Paimon (in respective order).

Teddy Killerz are known for producing various different styles of dance music ranging from drum’n’bass, dubstep, trap and breakbeat. The group have released on Owsla and subsequently signed to RAM Records in November 2014, (only after an initial release on RAM Records’ sister label "Program’). Teddy Killerz's entry in a remix contest on OWSLA for Skrillex’s song "Make It Bun Dem’ caught the attention of the label owner, who subsequently signed the band. Their first release on OWSLA was the ‘Toys Riot’ EP, consisting of three original songs. Teddy Killerz have also had a spate of releases on Bad Taste Recordings, Hardcore Beats and Dutty Audio.
Teddy Killerz have remixed a number of other artists’ work, although most notably Ragga Bomb by Skrillex featuring the Ragga Twins, which was released in 2014 on OWSLA, and ‘Make Those Move’ by the group I Am Legion (consisting of hip hop artists ‘Foreign Beggars’ and drum and bass artists ‘Noisia’) (released on OWSLA, Par Excellence and Division Recordings), which remained at number 1 on the beatport chart for 6 weeks.

In 2014, Teddy Killerz were selected by RAM Records for the ‘60 minutes of RAM’ mix for Mistajam on BBC 1 Xtra. They have also produced for and alongside dance/rock act Modestep which has sparked the song Make You Mine on their album London Road.

In 2015, Teddy Killerz's first release was Teddynator on 21 March on RAM Records and on 31 July 2015, also on RAM Records, their EP, Hyperspeed came out.

They released their first album on 5 June 2017, titled Nightmare Street.

More recently in 2020, they released an EP on Insomniac's bass music record label Bassrush titled Nerd Starter Pack

Discography

Albums

Singles

References

External links
Official page on RAM Records website
Official Soundcloud page

Russian electronic music groups
Drum and bass music groups
Owsla artists
Monstercat artists